Events in the year 1807 in Norway.

Incumbents
Monarch: Christian VII

Events
12 August - Start of the Gunboat War between Denmark-Norway and the United Kingdom.
1 September - The Norwegian Government commission was formed. 
18 September - British forces blows up Fredriksholm Fortress, four Englishmen was killed in the blast.
Porsgrunn is granted limited city status. Full city status is granted in 1842.

Arts and literature

 The oldest monument in Norway;  is erected.

Births

January to June
19 January – Peter Hersleb Graah Birkeland, bishop (d.1896)
27 January – Ulrik Anton Motzfeldt, jurist and politician (d.1865)
14 March – Josephine of Leuchtenberg, Swedish and Norwegian queen (d.1876)

July to December
29 November – Peter Severin Steenstrup, naval officer and businessperson (d.1863)
22 December – Johan Sebastian Welhaven, poet and critic (d.1873)

Full date unknown
Nils Fredrik Julius Aars, priest and politician (d.1865)
Halvor Olsen Folkestad, councillor of state (d.1889)
Peter Tidemand Malling, bookseller, printer and publisher (d.1878)
Hans Wille, priest and politician (d.1877)

Deaths
 16 September – Jochum Brinch Lund, merchant (b.1743).

References